In vertebrates, a venous plexus is a normal congregation anywhere in the body of multiple veins.

A list of venous plexuses:

 Basilar plexus
 Batson venous plexus
 Epidural venous plexus
 External vertebral venous plexuses 
 Internal vertebral venous plexuses
 Pampiniform venous plexus
 Prostatic venous plexus
 Pterygoid plexus
 Rectal venous plexus
 Soleal venous plexus
   Submucosal venous plexus of the nose
 Suboccipital venous plexus 
 Uterine venous plexus
 Vaginal venous plexus
 Venous plexus of hypoglossal canal
 Vesical venous plexus

References

Veins